Richard Alexander Smith Hylton (born 29 December 1967 in Limón) is a Costa Rican former football player, who used to play as a midfielder.

Club career
Nicknamed La Pantera, Smith made his Primera División debut for Alajuelense for whom he went on to score 44 goals in 315 matches during a 10-year spell. He played abroad for Guatemalan sides Municipal and  Antigua Guatemala and had spells at Santos de Guápiles and Carmelita.

He retired in 1997 as player of Limonense.

International career
Smith made his debut for Costa Rica in a November 1991 friendly match against the United States and earned a total of 15 caps, scoring 3 goals. He represented his country in 7 FIFA World Cup qualification matches and famously scored both goals in a World Cup qualifier against CONCACAF powerhouse Mexico in 1992.

His final internationals was a November 1997 FIFA World Cup qualification match against Canada.

Personal life
Son of Ricardo Alfonso Smith and Eloísa Hylton, Smith is married to Jeannette Valerín and they have two children.

References

External links
 

1967 births
Living people
People from Limón Province
Association football midfielders
Costa Rican footballers
Costa Rica international footballers
L.D. Alajuelense footballers
C.S.D. Municipal players
Santos de Guápiles footballers
A.D. Carmelita footballers
Costa Rican expatriate footballers
Expatriate footballers in Guatemala
Antigua GFC players
Liga FPD players